Kutz's Mill Bridge is a historic wooden covered bridge located at Greenwich Township in Berks County, Pennsylvania. It crosses the Sacony Creek. It is one of five covered bridges remaining in Berks County. As the name implies, it leads to the Kutz Mill.

It was listed on the National Register of Historic Places in 1981.

References

External links

Berks County Covered Bridges

Covered bridges on the National Register of Historic Places in Pennsylvania
Covered bridges in Berks County, Pennsylvania
Bridges completed in 1854
Wooden bridges in Pennsylvania
Bridges in Berks County, Pennsylvania
National Register of Historic Places in Berks County, Pennsylvania
Road bridges on the National Register of Historic Places in Pennsylvania
1854 establishments in Pennsylvania
Burr Truss bridges in the United States